Chatawa is an unincorporated community in Pike County, Mississippi, United States. Its ZIP code is 39632.

History
The first permanent settlement at Chatawa was made in 1817. The community derives its name from the Choctaw language, and it's purported to mean either "to be swollen" or "hunting ground".

Notes

Unincorporated communities in Pike County, Mississippi
Unincorporated communities in Mississippi
Mississippi placenames of Native American origin